Pizzey is a surname. Notable people with the surname include:

 Amos Pizzey (born 1967), British DJ
 Christopher Pizzey (born 1976), British actor
 Erin Pizzey (born 1939), British novelist and family care activist
 Graham Pizzey (1930–2001), Australian author, photographer and ornithologist
 Jack Pizzey (1911–1968), Premier of Queensland in 1968
 Jack Pizzey (television), British television documentary-maker and author